The chalkhill blue (Lysandra coridon) is a butterfly in the family Lycaenidae. It is a small butterfly that can be found throughout the Palearctic realm, where it occurs primarily in grasslands rich in chalk. Males have a pale blue colour, while females are brown. Both have chequered fringes around their wings.

Subspecies
Subspecies include:
 Lysandra coridon coridon
 Lysandra coridon borussia (Dadd, 1908) – (Urals) 
 Lysandra coridon asturiensis (Sagarra, 1922) – (Spain)

Ecology

Description
These small butterflies present a sexual dimorphism. The males having pale silvery-blue upperside of the wings with a submarginal line of grey spots on the hindwings and a thin brown and white chequered fringe. Females have dark brown upperside of wings, with marginal orange spots and also with chequered fringes. The underside of the wings show a light ochre colouration, several dark spots surrounded by white, a submarginal line of black marks, a series of marginal orange spots on the hindwings and a blue dusting near the body.

As with many blue butterflies, separation from similar species in the field is on the underside markings. Aberrations are common.

Distribution

Geographical range
This species can be found in the Palearctic realm (western Europe, southern Europe, central Europe, Asia Minor, south Urals, and northwest Turan). The range of L. coridon occurs throughout Central Europe, and is endemic to Europe. There are a few exceptions to where it is located in Central Europe, it is not found in the countries of Ireland, Scotland, Scandinavia, the Netherlands, the Iberian Peninsula (except in the northern provinces of Iberia), the Mediterranean islands (found in Corsica and Sardinia), and most of southern Italy.

Habitat
This species also has a preference towards grasslands that have short grass with many flowering plants. L. coridon is a sedentary organism which means that they do not travel very far within their habitat range. These individuals have the tendency to stay within their habitat patch rather than perform long migrations to find new habitats.

Biology
Note that information on this species applies to Great Britain and some details may not be consistent with the species in other parts of its range.

This species only produces one generation per year making them a univoltine, which means that this species only breeds once per year and will only produce one set of offspring.

L. coridon is monophagous, which means that they only feeds on one specific species of plant. The larvae or caterpillars of this species feed on the leaves of horseshoe vetch (Hippocrepis comosa).

When they are ready they pupate on the ground within the leaf litter of the host plants.

The caterpillars are attended by several different ants of the genera Myrmica, Lasius, Formica, Plagiolepis, Tetramorium, Aphaenogaster and Tapinoma.

This butterfly is usually seen on the wing from June to October.

In the research into the effects of trophic interaction and fragmentation it was found that there are no known parasitoids that are specialized to this species, but there are other parasitoids that are related to other species that are part of the family Lycaenidae which will sometimes predate this species. It could be a viable option that the parasitoids that did predate upon this species became extinct due to the fragmentation of their habitat in the past.

Evolution

Sibling species
Upon using allozyme analyses when looking at the species L. hispana and L. slovacus showed a difference in evolutionary history with L. coridon. The analysis showed that L. hispana has a large genetic distance between the two species and that there was allopatric speciation from L. coridon. L. slovacus seems to show that there was sympatry with L. coridon but the genetic analysis could not prove this hypothesis, so the researchers made the conclusion that this particular species was a local population that has an atavism of bivoltinism.

Post-glacial expansion
The expansion of the species travels from western Europe into eastern Europe from the ice-age refugium into the Balkans. The starting point for the expansion is in western Hungary traveling into the Balkans and then into Brandenburg and Poland. This expansion shows that are two routes due to the changes in gene allele frequencies and the degree of homogeneity of the species.

The two routes are:

1.) Starting in the western tip of Hungary traveling into north-eastern Hungry along the Hungarian Mountains into eastern Slovakia

2.) Starts in western Hungary and travels along the eastern Alps into western Slovakia and Czech Republic

The expansion caused there to be two unique genetic populations that were separated by mountain ranges. And the expansion also caused the movement of species that were only found in warmer areas to move into new habitats that were previously cooler in temperature and did not have the biotic components to support these new species.

Factors that affect genetic diversity

Habitat fragmentation
This would be physical features of the environment that separate populations of the same species. One type of would be mountain ranges which separate west and east population of L. coridon, and this separation causes there to be changes in the allele frequency of both population and there can be mixing of these populations only when there is an area that is connected.

Another type would be the loss of habitat which can lead to large habitat areas being fragmented, this loss can occur due to human interaction with the ecosystem in way that isolates populations of the species. The loss of habitat changes the number of individuals that the area can support or blocks the population off from a larger population. The limiting number of individuals in the population or the isolation can cause a decrease in the heterogeneity of population and leads to a decrease in fitness.

Habitat fragmentation causes conservation efforts to be difficult because it has to be decided what areas get protect or have the best possible chance of helping increase a population without damaging the overall fitness of the population, so great care is taken when selecting what areas will be protected.

Status and conservation

Status
According to IUCN Red List for Threatened Species, this particular species is of Least Concern, and this is due to this species not having a significant decline in population in the last ten years, which would be a decline by 25% in the number of adults.

Conservation
Since this species is of Least Concern there are few conservation efforts being put forth. But in certain areas that have been having large decline or had large decline implemented conservation efforts. This species is considered by researchers to be an indicator species of calcareous grassland habitat quality and could also be a good model organism to help develop conservation programs for more At Risk species.

Conservation in the United Kingdom, Germany, and Poland
All three countries have done research into the conservation of the calcareous grassland. Protecting this species would also lead to helping protect higher trophic level individuals that are located in this ecosystem.

United Kingdom
The chalkhill blue experienced a significant decline in population number in the 1950s. There was a rise in population between 1981 and 2000. In this time period there was a significant increase in numbers and this led to the stabilization of the population in the 1990s. The UK Biodiversity Action Plan had monitoring plans in place to see these changes and the data that was collected during that time period showed that the increase in population number came from the use of controlling grazing levels, conservation designation, and agri-environment schemes entry and management. These practices improved the quality of the habitats that were located in the United Kingdom.

Germany and Poland
Both Germany and Poland came up with action plans such as that if conservation efforts where to take place that the ideal area for protection would be large habitats that were interconnected with other Grassland habitats that were fragmented, and had a high abundance of the juvenile host plant located within it or had the ability to support a large number of plants.

Bibliography
 D.J. Carter (ill. B. Hargreaves), Guide des chenilles d'Europe, Paris, Delachaux & Niestlé, 2001
 Emmet, A.M. (1990) Lysandra coridon (Poda). Pages 160-162 in The Moths and Butterflies of Great Britain and Ireland Vol. 7 Part 1 (ed. A.M. Emmet and J. Heath). Harley Books, Colchester, UK.
 LepIndex: The Global Lepidoptera Names Index. Beccaloni G.W., Scoble M.J., Robinson G.S. & Pitkin B.
 Tom Tolman et Richard Lewington, Guide des papillons d'Europe et d'Afrique du Nord, Delachaux et Niestlé, 1997
 Tomlinson, D. and R. Still (2002) Britain's Butterflies. WildGuides, Old Basing, UK.

See also
List of butterflies of Great Britain

References

External links
 Kimmo Silvonen Larvae of North-European Lepidoptera
  Lepiforum.de

Lysandra (butterfly)
Butterflies of Europe
Butterflies of Asia
Butterflies described in 1761
Taxa named by Nikolaus Poda von Neuhaus